This is a list of submissions to the 51st Academy Awards for Best Foreign Language Film. The Academy Award for Best Foreign Language Film was created in 1956 by the Academy of Motion Picture Arts and Sciences to honour non-English-speaking films produced outside the United States. The award is handed out annually, and is accepted by the winning film's director, although it is considered an award for the submitting country as a whole. Countries are invited by the Academy to submit their best films for competition according to strict rules, with only one film being accepted from each country.

For the 51st Academy Awards, nineteen films were submitted in the category Academy Award for Best Foreign Language Film. Cuba and Lebanon submitted films for consideration for the first time. The highlighted titles were the five nominated films, which came from France, West Germany, Hungary, Italy and the USSR. France won the award with the comedy, Get Out Your Handkerchiefs, starring Gérard Depardieu as a husband who finds a new lover for his depressed wife.

Submissions

References

Sources
 Margaret Herrick Library, Academy of Motion Picture Arts and Sciences

51